Orlando Jesús Arcia (born August 4, 1994) is a Venezuelan professional baseball shortstop for the Atlanta Braves of Major League Baseball (MLB). The Milwaukee Brewers signed Arcia as an international free agent in 2010. He made his MLB debut in 2016 with the Brewers, and was traded to the Braves during the 2021 season.

Career

Milwaukee Brewers

The Milwaukee Brewers signed Arcia as an international free agent in October 2010. He made his professional debut in 2011 with the Dominican Summer League Brewers. He missed the 2012 season due to a broken ankle he suffered during spring training. Arcia returned in 2013 to play for the Wisconsin Timber Rattlers of the Class A Midwest League and played for the Brevard County Manatees of the Class A-Advanced Florida State League in 2014. He spent the 2015 season with the Biloxi Shuckers of the Class AA Southern League. In July, he played in the 2015 All-Star Futures Game. After hitting .307/.347/.453 with eight home runs, Arcia was named the Brewers Minor League Player of the Year for 2015. The Brewers added him to their 40-man roster after the season. He also spent 2014 and 2015 playing for the Caribes de Anzoategui of the Venezuelan Professional Baseball League, a winter league held during the MLB's offseason.

Arcia began the 2016 season with the Colorado Springs Sky Sox of the Class AAA Pacific Coast League. He made his major league debut on August 2. In 55 games for the Brewers, he hit .219/.273/.358 with 4 home runs and 17 RBIs. 

The following season, he played in 153 games, he hit .277/.324/.407 with 15 home runs and 14 stolen bases.

On July 1, 2018, he was demoted to AAA for the second time in the season. He was hitting .197 before the demotion. He was recalled on July 26 and rebounded to finish the season hitting .236/.268/.307 with 3 homers and 30 RBIs, including two walk-off singles. In game 3 of the NLDS against the Rockies, he homered off of Wade Davis to extend the Brewers' lead in their eventual series-clinching 6-0 victory. In Game 2 of the NLCS, he homered off of Hyun-jin Ryu to start the scoring, but the Brewers would lose that game to Los Angeles 4-3.

In 2019 he batted .223/.283/.350 with 15 home runs, and 59 RBIs. After the season, the Brewers acquired shortstop Luis Urías and had Arcia and Urías platoon at shortstop in 2020. He appeared in 59 games in 2020, batting .260/.317/.416 with 5 home runs and 20 RBI in 173 at-bats.

Atlanta Braves
On April 6, 2021, the Brewers traded Arcia to the Atlanta Braves for Patrick Weigel and Chad Sobotka. On July 3, Arcia was recalled from Triple-A Gwinnett. In 2021 in the majors, between the two teams he batted .198/.258/.309 with 2 home runs and 14 RBIs in 81 at bats. The Braves finished with an 88-73 record, clinching the NL East, and eventually won the 2021 World Series, giving the Braves their first title since 1995.

On November 30, 2021, Arcia and the Braves agreed to a two-year contract worth $3 million. Following an injury to Ozzie Albies, Arcia became the Braves' starting second baseman. During a game against the Boston Red Sox on August 9, Arica injured his hamstring while running the bases.

Personal life
His older brother, Oswaldo Arcia, has played in MLB, and is currently playing for the Cleburne Railroaders of the American Association of Professional Baseball.

See also
 List of Major League Baseball players from Venezuela

References

External links

 

1994 births
Living people
Atlanta Braves players
Biloxi Shuckers players
Brevard County Manatees players
Caribes de Anzoátegui players
Colorado Springs Sky Sox players
Dominican Summer League Brewers players
Gwinnett Stripers players
Major League Baseball players from Venezuela
Major League Baseball shortstops
Milwaukee Brewers players
Wisconsin Timber Rattlers players
Venezuelan expatriate baseball players in the United States
People from Anzoátegui